Vexillum balteolatum is a species of sea snail, a marine gastropod mollusk, in the family Costellariidae, the ribbed miters.

Description
The length of the shell varies between 29 mm and 45 mm.

Distribution
This marine species occurs off the Philippines and in the South China Sea.

References

External links
 Reeve, L. A. (1844-1845). Monograph of the genus Mitra. In: Conchologia Iconica, or, illustrations of the shells of molluscous animals, vol. 2, pl. 1-39 and unpaginated text. L. Reeve & Co., London
 Sowerby, G. B. III. (1879). Descriptions of ten new species of shells. Proceedings of the Zoological Society of London. 1878: 795–798, pl. 48. (April 1879).

balteolatum
Gastropods described in 1844